This list of the neighborhoods of Tel Aviv, is arranged geographically from north to south, then from west to east.

Northwest

Residential
 Azorei Hen (אזורי חן), Areas of Grace
 Kokhav HaTzafon (כוכב הצפון), Northern Star
 Shikun Lamed (שיכון למד), L Neighborhood
 Migdalei Ne'eman (מגדלי נאמן) Faithful Towers
 Neve Avivim (נווה אביבים), Springs Oasis (also known as Ramat Aviv Bet/ 2)
 Nofei Yam (נופי ים) Sea view
 Ramat Aviv Aleph  (רמת אביב א'), Spring Height 1
 Ramat Aviv Gimmel (רמת אביב ג'), Spring Height 3
 Ramat Aviv HaHadasha (רמת אביב החדשה), New Spring Height

Non-residential regions
 Museum campus
 Tel Aviv University Campus
 Yarkon Park (Park Ha-Yarkon officially Ganei Yehoshua/ Joshua Gardens)

Northeast
Residential
 Ganei Tzahala (גני צהלה), Gardens of Joy
 HaMishtalah (המשתלה), The [Plant] Nursery
 Hadar Yosef (הדר יוסף), Glory of Joseph (Elishar)
 Ma'oz Aviv (מעוז אביב), Spring Fortress
 Ne'ot Afeka (נאות אפקה), Beautiful Pastures
 Neve Sharret (נוה שרת), (Moshe) Sharett Oasis
 Ramat HaHayal (רמת החייל), Soldier's Hill (also known as (רמת החי"ל), HIL (acronym for the Jewish Brigade) Height)
 Ramot Tzahala (רמות צהלה), Heights of IDF-Joy (Portmanteau from IDF and Joy) Revivim (רביבים),Mild rainstorms Shikun Dan (שיכון דן), Dan Neighborhood Tel Baruch (תל ברוך), (Mordechai Joseph) Baruch Hill Tzahala (צהלה), Portmanteau from IDF and Joy
 Yisgav (ישגב), He will be Great

Non-residential regions
 Kiryat Atidim (קריית עתידים), Campus of the Future

Central 
Residential
 HaTzafon HaYashan (הצפון הישן), The Old North
 Yehuda HaMaccabi (יהודה המכבי) Judah the Maccabi
 Montefiore (מונטיפיורי), (Moses) Montefiore
 Lev HaIr (לב העיר), The City Center/Core, lit. Heart of the City  
 Kerem Hatemanim (כרם התימנים), Yemenites Vineyard
 Bavli, (בבלי) Babylonian (Talmud)
 Tzamarot Ayalon (צמרות איילון), Ayalon Treetops 
 Giv'at Amal Bet (גבעת עמל ב'), Workers Hill B
 Neve Tzedek (נווה צדק), Righteousness House
 Shabazi (שבזי), (Shalom) Shabazi
 Ohel Moshe (אהל משה), Moshe Tent (merged with Neve Tzedek)

Non-residential regions
 HaRakevet (הרכבת), The Train
 HaKirya (הקרייה), The (Government) Campus
 Menashiya (מנשייה)

Southwest

 Old Jaffa (יפו העתיקה), Old Jaffa
 Yafo C (יפו דרום), Jaffa South
 Giv'at HaTmarim (גבעת התמרים), Dates Hill
 Ajami (עג'מי), (Ibrahim) al-Ajami
 Tzahalon (צהלון), Rejoice
 Givat Aliyah (גבעת עלייה), Aliyah Hill = Elevation's Hill

South

 Florentin (פלורנטין)
 Neve Sha'anan (נווה שאנן), Serenity's Oasis / Peaceful Abode
 Neve Ofer (נווה עופר), (Avraham) Ofer Oasis, also Tel Kabir
 Kiryat Shalom (קריית שלום), City of Peace
 Shapira (שפירא), (Meir Gezl) Shapira
 Giv'at Herzl (גבעת הרצל), Herzl Hill
 Abu Kabir (אבו כביר), named after Tall al Kabir, Egypt 
 American–German Colony (המושבה האמריקאית-גרמנית)

Southeast
 Nahalat Yitzhak (נחלת יצחק), Yitzchak's (Spektor) Estate
 Bitzaron (ביצרון), Little Fortress
 Ramat Yisrael (רמת ישראל), Israel (Rokach) Heights
 Tel Haim (תל חיים), Haim (Chisin) Hill
 Yad Eliyahu (יד אליהו), Eliyahu (Golomb) Memorial
 Ramat HaTayasim (רמת הטייסים), Pilots' Height
 Neve Tzahal (נוה צה"ל), Oasis of the IDF
 Kfar Shalem (כפר שלם), Peaceful Village
 HaArgazim (הארגזים), The Crates
 Shkhunat HaTikva (שכונת התקווה), The Hope Quarter
 Neve Barbur (נווה בארבור), Swan Oasis / Swan's Abode
 Ezra (עזרא) Ezra (the Scribe)

References